Siavash Bakhtiarizadeh (born 18 October 1961) is an Iranian football manager. Sohrab Bakhtiarizadeh is his cousin. Kourosh and Darush Bakhtiarizadeh are also his brothers Darush has been retired and Kourosh was coach of Foolad for years.

References

External links
 Siavash Bakhtiarizadeh at metafootball.com
 Siavash Bakhtiarizadeh at football.com

Living people
Iranian football managers
1961 births
People from Ahvaz
Sportspeople from Khuzestan province